Parisian may refer to:
 a native or inhabitant of Paris
 Standard French, based on the dialect of Paris
 Parisian (department store chain), a department store chain bought by Belk, based in Birmingham, Alabama
 Parisian stitch, an embroidery stitch
 Pontiac Parisienne, a full-size rear-wheel drive vehicle
 a font designed by Morris Fuller Benton in 1928
 SS Parisian, a steamship in the Allan Line Royal Mail Steamers

See also
Paris (disambiguation)

Language and nationality disambiguation pages